Jacqueline Patorni (15 May 1917– 12 March 2002) was a French tennis player. She was runner up in the 1944 Tournoi de France, losing the final in straight sets to Raymonde Veber. Patorni also reached the third round of the 1946 Wimbledon Championships – Women's Singles.

Grand Slam finals

Mixed doubles (1 runner-up)

References

1917 births
2002 deaths
French female tennis players
20th-century French women